St. Michael's Church is a ruined church in Menshat, Lezhë District, Albania. It is a Cultural Monument of Albania.

References

Cultural Monuments of Albania
Church ruins in Albania
Buildings and structures in Lezhë County